McAlinden is a surname. Notable people with the surname include:

Bobby McAlinden (born 1946), English footballer
Danny McAlinden (1947–2021), Northern Ireland footballer
Edith McAlinden (born 1968), Scottish murderer
Jimmy McAlinden (1917–1993), footballer
Kevin McAlinden (1913–1978), Northern Ireland footballer
Liam McAlinden (born 1993), English-Irish footballer